Wiktorowo may refer to the following places:
Wiktorowo, Grudziądz County in Kuyavian-Pomeranian Voivodeship (north-central Poland)
Wiktorowo, Gmina Lubień Kujawski in Kuyavian-Pomeranian Voivodeship (north-central Poland)
Wiktorowo, Gmina Rogowo in Kuyavian-Pomeranian Voivodeship (north-central Poland)
Wiktorowo, Podlaskie Voivodeship (north-east Poland)
Wiktorowo, Nowy Dwór Mazowiecki County in Masovian Voivodeship (east-central Poland)
Wiktorowo, Przasnysz County in Masovian Voivodeship (east-central Poland)
Wiktorowo, Gmina Buk in Greater Poland Voivodeship (west-central Poland)
Wiktorowo, Gmina Kostrzyn in Greater Poland Voivodeship (west-central Poland)
Wiktorowo, Środa Wielkopolska County in Greater Poland Voivodeship (west-central Poland)
Wiktorowo, Warmian-Masurian Voivodeship (north Poland)